Dane Alex Bird-Smith (born 15 July 1992) is an Australian racewalking athlete. He competes in the 20 kilometres race walk, and has a best of 1:19:28 hours for the distance, set in 2017. He competed at the 2016 Rio Olympics, where he was the bronze medallist. Bird-Smith represented Australia at the World Championships in Athletics three times (2013, 2015, and 2017), and has appeared four times at the IAAF World Race Walking Team Championships/Cup.

He was the gold medallist at the Commonwealth Games in 2018, the Summer Universiade in 2015 and the Oceania Race Walking Championships in 2018 and 2014. He is the son of former Australian Olympic walker David Smith.

He holds the Oceanian continental records for the 3000 metres walk and 5000 metres walk. He is now playing AFL for the Kenmore Bears.

Career

Early life and career
The son of David Smith, an international racewalker, Queensland-born Bird-Smith initially took up athletics but focused on the 400 metres. However he switched to racewalking as a teenager and began to be coached by his father. He attended Indooroopilly State High School and St Peters Lutheran College.

Bird-Smith had his first national success in 2008 when he won the Australian youth title. Junior-level titles followed the next year and he also made his international debut, placing eight at the 2009 World Youth Championships in Athletics. He repeated as road and track national junior champion in 2010 and set an Australian junior record of 41:32.36 minutes for the 10,000 metres race walk while finishing fifth at the 2010 World Junior Championships in Athletics. He also made his debut at the 2010 IAAF World Race Walking Cup, but was disqualified from the junior race for foot-lifting. He improved further to 41:02.18 minutes in 2011 and also set an Oceanian record of 40:56 minutes in the 10 km road walk discipline to win the exhibition event at the Oceania Race Walking Championships.

First senior competitions
Bird-Smith began to take part in senior competitions towards the end of 2011 and on his international circuit debut at the Gran Premio Cantones de La Coruña, ending the race in 13th place. His debut in the 20 kilometres race walk event came in December and he recorded a time of 1:26:38 hours. He bettered this on the 2012 IAAF World Race Walking Challenge circuit, setting a time of 1:23:15 hours in Taicang. He ranked 43rd in the senior 20 km race at the 2012 IAAF World Race Walking Cup before winning his first national title in August.

A second national title came at the 2013 Australian Athletics Championships, this time in the 5000 m walk – an event in which he also set a best of 18:56.96 minutes to rank third in the world that year. He set a personal best at the Oceanian Championships 20 km race, taking second behind his compatriot Jared Tallent and had his first top three finish on the circuit at the Coppa Città di Sesto San Giovanni. A new best of 1:22:03 following at the La Coruña race, where he was fourth overall. This built up to his debut appearance for Australia the 2013 World Championships in Athletics, at which he performed well with an eleventh-place finish, marking his entry into the top tiers of international competition, and also outdoing his father's highest placing at the event. He ended 2013 by defending his 20 km national title. In 2016 Dane won a bronze medal in the 2016 Rio olympics.

Bird-Smith made some quick improvements in the 20 km event in 2014. After winning his first Oceanian title in February, he walked 1:21:01 for third in Nomi, Ishikawa, then achieved a lifetime best of 1:20:27 hours at the 2014 IAAF World Race Walking Cup, ranking 14th. With no other major championships to compete at, he took to the circuit and won the British Grand Prix of Race Walking as well as a third straight Australian 20 km title. He ranked in the global top-25 for the year.

In 2015, Bird-Smith placed fifth at both the IAAF Race Walking Challenge Taicang and La Coruña race, setting a new best of 1:20:05 hours at the latter. This preceded his first ever global gold medal, which the University of Queensland student achieved at the 2015 Universiade, narrowly overturning the lead of Canada's Benjamin Thorne.

Personal bests
3000 metres race walk – 10:54.70 min (2017)
5000 metres race walk – 18:38.97 min (2016)
10,000 metres race walk – 38:34.23 min (2017)
10 kilometres race walk – 39:30 min (2015)
20 kilometres race walk – 1:19:28 hrs (2017)

National titles
Australian Athletics Championships
5000 m walk: 2012
10,000 m walk: 2014, 2015, 2016, 2017
Australian Race Walking Championships
20 km walk: 2012, 2013, 2014

International competitions

See also
List of Olympic medalists in athletics (men)
List of Australian athletics champions (men)
List of Australian Olympic medallists in athletics
List of 2016 Summer Olympics medal winners
Race walking at the Olympics

References

External links
 
 Dane Bird-Smith at Athletics Australia
 Dane Bird-Smith at Australian Athletics Historical Results
 
 
 
 
 

1992 births
Living people
Australian male racewalkers
Olympic male racewalkers
Olympic athletes of Australia
Olympic bronze medalists for Australia
Olympic bronze medalists in athletics (track and field)
Athletes (track and field) at the 2016 Summer Olympics
Medalists at the 2016 Summer Olympics
Commonwealth Games gold medallists for Australia
Commonwealth Games medallists in athletics
Athletes (track and field) at the 2018 Commonwealth Games
Universiade gold medalists for Australia
Universiade medalists in athletics (track and field)
World Athletics Championships athletes for Australia
Sportsmen from Queensland
University of Queensland alumni
Australian Athletics Championships winners
Commonwealth Games gold medallists in athletics
Medalists at the 2015 Summer Universiade
21st-century Australian people
Medallists at the 2018 Commonwealth Games